The Unbeatables is a 1993 Chinese drama serial produced by Singapore's Mandarin channel, Channel 8.

The Unbeatables is best remembered for being the first Singaporean show on gambling, and featured early television appearances from Zoe Tay and Li Nanxing who went on to become two of the country's most prolific and popular actors in their respective genders. The show is set on the fictitious Coral Island (珊瑚岛), and is essentially about the intense rivalry and animosity between the families the two protagonists are in. However, the latest sequel Unbeatables III in 2002, features a completely different storyline and plot which involves sorcery, epic fights and the like, although Zoe Tay and Li Nanxing reprised their roles as they did for the previous two series. The sequels however have not matched the ratings success that the Unbeatables I had received.

It spanned three seasons: 
The Unbeatables I - 1993
The Unbeatables II - 1996
The Unbeatables III - 2002

Singapore Chinese dramas

id:The Unbeatables
zh:双天至尊